Aquadulciospora is a genus of fungi within the class Sordariomycetes. The relationship of this taxon to other taxa within the class is unknown (incertae sedis). This is a monotypic genus, containing the single species Aquadulciospora rhomboidia.

References

External links
Index Fungorum

Sordariomycetes enigmatic taxa
Monotypic Sordariomycetes genera